Elachista bisulcella is a moth of the family Elachistidae that is found in Europe.

Description
The head is dark grey, face whitish. Forewings are  dark fuscous, blackish-sprinkled ; a hardly
curved whitish central fascia, edged with yellow posteriorly, broader towards dorsum ; tips of apical cilia whitish. Hindwings are dark grey.The larva is grey-green; head pale brown ; 2 with two brown spots.

Biology
Adults are on wing at the end of June and again in August in two generations per year.

The larvae feed on false-brome (Brachypodium sylvaticum), wood small-reed (Calamagrostis epigejos), upright sedge (Carex stricta), tufted hair-grass (Deschampsia cespitosa) and tall fescue (Festuca arundinacea). They mine the leaves of their host plant. The mine has the form of a descending and widening corridor. In the end, it has the form of an elongate blotch that may occupy the entire width of the leaf. The frass is deposited in elongate lumps in the centre of the mine. Larvae can be found from autumn to June. The species overwinters within the mine. They are dull grey green with a pale brown head.

Distribution
Found in Europe from Fennoscandia to the Pyrenees, Italy and Romania and from Ireland to Poland.

References

External links
 Plant Parasites of Europe

bisulcella
Leaf miners
Moths described in 1843
Moths of Europe
Taxa named by Philogène Auguste Joseph Duponchel